Kirknewton railway station is a railway station serving Kirknewton in West Lothian, Scotland, Opened as Kirknewton in February 1848, the station was renamed Midcalder and Kirknewton after two months, before becoming Midcalder in 1855. The full circle was finally completed 127 years later in May 1982 when the name reverted to Kirknewton. This was to distinguish it from Kirknewton station near  on the NER Cornhill Branch.

It is managed by ScotRail.

As there is no footbridge on the station (the footbridge was removed prior to electrification), passengers wishing to cross the line must do so via the level crossing, which is one of the most incorrectly used in Scotland. There are plans to provide a new crossing (subway) which will remove the level crossing. The level crossing is automatic and approach controlled which means trains which call at the station towards Glasgow have to stop so the driver can turn on the level crossing, This is done to allow traffic to cross when the train is stopped in the station.

History 
Kirknewton was the terminus of the Slateford–Balerno line. A bay platform can still be seen to the east of the Edinburgh bound platform. The trains ran alongside the Water of Leith for 65 years, the line finally being closed to passengers on 30 October 1943. Goods trains continued to run until the line was officially closed, aided by the closure of the Kinleith Mill in 1966, to all traffic on 4 December 1967.

Services 

There is a limited Sunday service to Edinburgh and  Glasgow of just six trains each way.

This is operated by a Class 380 EMU. 

As this station is on the Edinburgh branch of the  West Coast Main Line; a variety of Avanti West Coast, CrossCountry, London North Eastern Railway and TransPennine Express trains pass through without stopping.

References

Notes

Sources 

 
 

Railway stations in West Lothian
Railway stations served by ScotRail
Railway stations in Great Britain opened in 1848
Former Caledonian Railway stations
William Tite railway stations